David Marr may refer to:

 David Marr (neuroscientist) (1945–1980), British neuroscientist
 David Marr (journalist) (born 1947), Australian journalist and biographer
 David G. Marr (born 1937), American historian
 Dave Marr (1933–1997), golfer and sportscaster